Nyhamna is a small peninsula on the northeast side of the island of Gossa in Aukra Municipality in Møre og Romsdal county, Norway.

The area was once a whaling station, but is now an industrial area. Since 2002, it has been the landing place of the natural gas from the Ormen Lange (gas field) gas field. At this facility, the gas enters a processing facility, the Nyhamna Gas Plant that is connected to the northern end of the Langeled pipeline which transports the gas under the sea to Easington in England.

References

Aukra
Populated places in Møre og Romsdal
Natural gas terminals